Major General Stuart Heintzelman (19 November 1876 – 6 July 1935) was an American soldier. He was a grandson of Civil War general Samuel P. Heintzelman.

Military career
He was commissioned as a second lieutenant of cavalry from the United States Military Academy in 1899. For the first five years of his career, he served with the 6th Cavalry in Kansas and Idaho, the 4th Cavalry in the Philippines, and as part of the international force putting down the Boxer uprising in China. In 1904, Heintzelman began what would become a long and distinguished association with Fort Leavenworth when he was selected as the Infantry and Cavalry School honor graduate. After service in the Philippines, Heintzelman returned to Fort Leavenworth as an instructor followed by another academic assignment as the Professor of Military Art and Science at Princeton University.

During World War I, as a general staff officer with the American Expeditionary Force, Heintzelman was responsible for planning the St. Mihiel Offensive.  He also served with the French in the Chemin des Dames offensive in October 1917, and in winter operations in northern Italy with the French Tenth Army. He concluded his tour in France as chief of staff for both IV Corps and later Second Army. From 1921 to 1929, he held numerous command and staff positions, including command of the 22nd Infantry Brigade, commander of the Eastern Defenses of New York, and Assistant Chief of Staff for War Plans.  In 1929, he again returned to Fort Leavenworth to serve as the commandant of the Command and General Staff College and was promoted to major general in 1931.  As commandant, Heintzelman was influential in updating the curriculum and actively participated in the classroom.

Death
Following a gall bladder operation at the Army-Navy Hospital, Hot Springs National Park, Arkansas, Heintzelman died in 1935. At the time, he was in command of the Seventh Corps Area, Fort Omaha, Nebraska. He is buried in the Arlington National Cemetery with his wife, who had died a few months before.

Awards
Heintzelman's awards include the Commander of the Legion of Honor and the Croix de Guerre with palm from France, the Commander of the Order of the Crown by the Italian Government, and the Distinguished Service Medal. He was also holder of the Philippine, China, Mexican border and Victory campaign badges.

Legacy
The , named in his honor, was launched in April 1945.

References

External links

 Army.mil: Heintzelman

 Stuart Heintzelman at ArlingtonCemetery.net, an unofficial website

United States Military Academy alumni
Burials at Arlington National Cemetery
United States Army generals of World War I
United States Army generals
1876 births
1935 deaths
United States Army Cavalry Branch personnel
Commandants of the United States Army Command and General Staff College
American expatriates in the Philippines
Princeton University faculty
American people of German descent